Hamilchama al hashalom is a 1968 film directed by Jules Dassin. A version in French was released under the title Comme un éclair, and the English language release was titled Survival 1967.

Synopsis
This film documentary uses the 1967 Six-Day War and its immediate aftermath as its basis. The material primarily presents Israeli sources and perspectives. It has been characterized as an anti-war screed. The film was panned for presenting little footage documenting the war, as well as for conflicting, alternating viewpoints and overall lack of narrative focus.

References

External links

1968 films
Films directed by Jules Dassin
Six-Day War
Documentary films about the Arab–Israeli conflict
1968 documentary films
1960s English-language films